Indooroopilly was an electoral district of the Legislative Assembly in the Australian state of Queensland from 1992 to 2017.

The district was based in the western suburbs of Brisbane, and straddled both sides of the Brisbane River. It was named for the suburb of Indooroopilly and also included the suburbs of Chelmer, Fig Tree Pocket, Graceville, Sherwood, St Lucia and Taringa. After a redistribution in 2008 it included parts of Tennyson. It was first created for the 1992 election.

Indooroopilly was a marginal seat, having been won narrowly by Labor in three elections between 2001 and 2006. On 5 October 2008, sitting member Ronan Lee resigned from the Labor Party and defected to the Queensland Greens. Lee was defeated at the 2009 election by Liberal National candidate Scott Emerson.

Indooroopilly was abolished in a boundary redistribution for the 2017 state election. It was replaced by the district of Maiwar.

Members for Indooroopilly

Election results

References

External links
 

Former electoral districts of Queensland
Constituencies established in 1992
1992 establishments in Australia
Constituencies disestablished in 2017
2017 disestablishments in Australia